Archangelos is a fishing village in Laconia in the south-eastern Peloponnese. It is part of the community Daimonia within the municipal unit Asopos.

See also
 List of settlements in Laconia

References

Populated places in Laconia
Monemvasia